Leicester City Council elections are held every four years. Leicester City Council is the local authority for the unitary authority of Leicester in Leicestershire, England. Until 1 April 1997 it was a non-metropolitan district. Since 2011 it has also had a directly elected mayor. Since the last boundary changes in 2015, 54 councillors have been elected from 21 wards.

Political control
From 1889 to 1974 Leicester was a county borough, independent of any county council. Under the Local Government Act 1972 it became a non-metropolitan district, with Leicestershire County Council providing county-level services. The first election to the reformed city council was held in 1973, initially operating as a shadow authority before coming into its revised powers on 1 April 1974. Leicester became a unitary authority on 1 April 1997, regaining its independence from Leicestershire County Council. Political control of the city council since 1973 has been held by the following parties:

Non-metropolitan district

Unitary authority

Leadership
Political leadership is provided by the directly elected Mayor of Leicester. The separate post of Lord Mayor is the council's ceremonial figurehead and chairs full council meetings. Prior to 2011 political leadership was provided by the leader of the council. The leaders from 1973 to 2011 were:

Since 2011, the directly elected mayor has been:

Council elections
1973 Leicester City Council election
1976 Leicester City Council election
1979 Leicester City Council election
1983 Leicester City Council election (New ward boundaries)
1984 Leicester City Council election
1986 Leicester City Council election
1987 Leicester City Council election
1991 Leicester City Council election (City boundary changes took place but the number of seats remained the same)
1995 Leicester City Council election
1996 Leicester City Council election
1998 Leicester City Council election
1999 Leicester City Council election
2003 Leicester City Council election (New ward boundaries reduced the number of seats by 2)
2007 Leicester City Council election
2011 Leicester City Council election
2015 Leicester City Council election (New ward boundaries)
2019 Leicester City Council election

Mayoral elections
Leicester mayoral election, 2011
Leicester mayoral election, 2015
Leicester mayoral election, 2019

By-election results

1995-1999

1999-2003

2003-2007

2007-2011

2011-2015

2015-2019

2019-2023

References

External links
Leicester City Council
By-election results

 
Elections in Leicester
Council elections in Leicestershire
Unitary authority elections in England